Self-Defence of Lithuania and Belarus were voluntary military formations created during the reconstitution of sovereign Poland towards the end of World War I in the Kresy macroregion, formerly the Western Krai of the Russian Empire. Self-Defence units were composed mostly of Poles loyal to the nascent Second Polish Republic, formed after a century of Partitions. Their areas of operation were centered around Vilnius (Wilno), Minsk (Mińsk) and Grodno. In January 1919, the Polish Self-Defence was officially organized as the 1st Lithuanian–Belarusian Division; the division took part in the Polish–Soviet War of 1919–1920.

History

The local Self-Defence units were formed in 1918. They were primarily involved in protecting residents from the Russian Army deserters and other threats. The Self-Defence quelled robbery by peasants and fought the Bolsheviks, who followed the retreating German forces.

On 8 December 1918 General Władysław Wejtko, formerly of the Imperial Russian Army and one of the organizers of the Self-Defence, arrived in Warsaw, the capital of Poland. Polish Chief of State Józef Piłsudski confirmed his military rank of Lieutenant general in the newly-formed Polish Army and nominated him to be the leader of all Polish voluntary forces in the area of present-day Lithuania and Belarus. Wejtko received 375,000 marks from the Kresy Defense Committee for the current needs of the Self-Defence, including provisions, allowances, firearm purchase, and horses.

The militias were soon overwhelmed by numerically superior Bolshevik armies. In December 1918 in Minsk, a group of 1,500 Poles and Belarusians under the Self-Defence banner rose to arms to defend the city against the advancing forces of Soviet Russia. However, due to the Russian numerical superiority and the lack of ground support from the short-lived Belarusian National Republic, they withdrew toward Poland.

In early January 1919, a 2,500 men-strong Self-Defence force was created in the Vilnius Region to defend it against the Red Army. As a result of the four-day-long battle for Vilnius (Wilno) which lasted until 5 January, the Polish forces were pushed back near Naujoji Vilnia (Nowa Wilejka) and retreated in the southern direction, toward what used to be Regency Poland. [Part 1] The area changed hands several times in the following months, during the Vilna offensive of 19–21 April 1919 and Operation Minsk of early August.

In January 1919, most of the Self-Defence forces were joined into the 1st Lithuanian–Belarusian Division under the command of General Wejtko. They officially became part of the Polish Army.

Citations

References
 "1. Samoobrona kresów (IX 1918 – I 1919)." Koło Kombatantów przy AGH. Kraków, 2017.
 "2. Początkowy etap wojny polsko-bolszewickiej (II - XII 1919)." Koło Kombatantów przy AGH. Kraków, 2017.
Short entry from Encyklopedia Interia 

Military units and formations of Poland
Belarus–Poland relations
Lithuania–Poland relations
Western Belorussia (1918–1939)